Rowta Chariali is a small town located in Udalguri district of Assam, one of the North Eastern States of India, South East Asia connected to NH-15.  Rowta is located in Udalguri district under the jurisdiction of Bodoland Territorial Council which controls the Bodoland Territorial Region. Rowta is located along the bank of the River Dhansiri.

Politics
Rowta is a part of Mangaldoi (Lok Sabha Constituency). Dilip Saikia is at present MP of Mangaldoi Lok Sabha Constituency. He is currently the national General secretary of Bharatiya Janata Party.
Again, Rowta is a part of Majbat Assembly Constituency and at present Charan Boro of Bodoland Peoples' Front (BPF) party is MLA of the Constituency.

Geography

Transportation
Rowta is connected with a Railway Station namely Rowta Bagan and approx distance is about 2.5 Kms to the north direction from Rowta Chariali. Rowta Bagan Railway Station is a station on Rangia-Murkongselek section under Rangia Railway Division of Northeast Frontier Railway Zone with services to important cities of the State like Guwahati, Tezpur, Rangapara, Biswanath Chariali, Dhemaji etc. 
Also bus services is served by the government owned Assam State Transport Corporation, Bodoland Transport Services and many private bus operators along Guwahati to Tezpur, Rowta to Kokrajhar via Tamulpur.

Academic
The town has several school and colleges within the town are like Danda Saharia Higher Secondary School, Joy Bhadra Hagjer Memorial High School, Rowta Junior College, Kasturba Gandhi Balika Vidyalaya, Sacred Heart School, North East Public School,Rowta Station High School etc.

References

Villages in Udalguri district